Dr John Murray FRSE FGS (1778–1820) was a short-lived 19th century Scottish physician and prominent scientist, working in the fields of physics, chemistry, and geology, and described by Brydges as a "Chemical Philiospher". His first important published work, "Elements of Chemistry", appeared when he was only 23.

Life
He was born in Edinburgh in 1778 and educated at the High School. He studied Medicine at St Andrews University graduating around 1798.

He appears in Edinburgh again in 1810 as a lecturer in Chemistry. He later also lectured in Materia Medica, Pharmacy and Natural Philosophy (Physics).

In 1812 he was elected a Fellow of the Royal Society of Edinburgh for his contributions to Geology, his proposers being Thomas Charles Hope, Robert Jameson, and Sir George Steuart Mackenzie. He was made a Fellow of the Royal College of Physicians of Edinburgh in 1815 and was also elected a Fellow of the Royal Geographical Society of London. He presented 28 papers to the Royal Society, the most important relating to proposals for a safety lamp for miners.

He received his doctorate (MD) in 1814.

He lived at 31 Nicolson Street in south Edinburgh and died there on 22 July 1820.

Family

His children included Dr John Murray (1798–1873) who emigrated to Australia and died in Melbourne.

Publications

Elements of Chemistry (1801)
A Comparative view of Huttonian and Neptunian Systems of Geology (1802)
Elements of Materia Medica and Pharmacy (1804)
A System of Chemistry (1806/7)

References

1778 births
1820 deaths
Scientists from Edinburgh
Alumni of the University of St Andrews
Scottish geologists
Scottish physicists
Scottish chemists
Fellows of the Royal Society of Edinburgh
Fellows of the Royal Geographical Society
Fellows of the Royal College of Physicians of Edinburgh